Sidney Jarvis (14 September 1905–1994) was an English footballer who played in the Football League for Middlesbrough.

References

1905 births
1994 deaths
English footballers
Association football defenders
English Football League players
Hull City A.F.C. players
Darlington F.C. players
Kettering Town F.C. players
Raith Rovers F.C. players
Middlesbrough F.C. players
USL Dunkerque players